Timothy David Barnes,  (born 13 March 1942) is a British classicist.

Biography
Barnes was born in Yorkshire on 13 March 1942. He was educated at Queen Elizabeth Grammar School, Wakefield, until 1960, going up to Balliol College, Oxford, where he read Literae Humaniores, taking his BA in 1964 and MA in 1967. He was Harmsworth Senior Scholar of Merton College, Oxford, 1964–66 and Junior Research Fellow of The Queen's College, Oxford 1966–70. He was awarded his DPhil in 1970. In 1974 the University of Oxford conferred upon him the Conington prize.

On receiving his doctorate he was immediately appointed assistant professor of Classics at University College, University of Toronto, and in 1972 he was appointed associate professor. In 1976 he became professor of Classics, a post he held for thirty-one years until his retirement in 2007. He was three times associate chairman of Classics (1979–83, 1986–89, 1995–96). In the year 1976/7 he was a visiting member of the Institute for Advanced Study. 1983/4 he was Visiting Fellow of Wolfson College, Oxford and 1984/5 he was Connaught Senior Fellow in the Humanities. In 1989 he was elected a Fellow of the University of Trinity College. He delivered the Townsend Lectures at Cornell University in 1994.

In 1982 he was awarded both the Philip Schaff Prize by the American Society of Church History for Constantine and Eusebius and the Charles Goodwin Award of Merit by the American Philological Association. In 1985 he was elected Fellow of the Royal Society of Canada and in 2009 Foreign Member of the Finnish Society of Sciences and Letters.

In December 2007, he officially retired from the University of Toronto, and returned to the United Kingdom. He is currently an honorary fellow at the University of Edinburgh's School of Divinity, working with the Centre for the Study of Christian Origins.

Most of Barnes's work has concerned the position of Christianity in the Later Roman Empire, both before state recognition of the Church and the working in practice of the latter. Many of his articles have challenged traditionally held chronologies and explored the implications of fresh dating.

Selected works

Notes

References
 

1942 births
Living people
Fellows of the Royal Society of Canada
Academic staff of the University of Toronto
Fellows of The Queen's College, Oxford
Fellows of Wolfson College, Oxford
Alumni of Balliol College, Oxford
Alumni of Merton College, Oxford
People educated at Queen Elizabeth Grammar School, Wakefield
Academics of the University of Edinburgh
Fellows of the British Academy